The Mediterranean Squadron, also known as the Mediterranean Station, was part of the United States Navy in the 19th century that operated in the Mediterranean Sea. It was formed in response to the First and Second Barbary Wars. Between 1801 and 1818, the squadron was composed of a series of rotating squadrons.  Later, squadrons were sent in the 1820s to the 1860s to suppress piracy, primarily in Greece and to engage in gunboat diplomacy. In 1865 the force was renamed the European Squadron.

History

First Barbary War

The Barbary pirates' seizure of American merchant ships went back to just after the victory over Great Britain in 1783. When the Dey of Algiers demanded tribute, the Americans refused and thus began a long series of conflict between the Barbary states and the United States lasting from the 1780s to 1815. The Mediterranean Squadron was created for the protection of American merchant ships sailing in Mediterranean waters.
The first squadron sent was under the command of Commodore Richard Dale. During the squadron's deployment from 1801 to 1802, it operated by convoying merchant ships. Commodore Dale did not have orders to capture enemy vessels and could only respond to the North African's attacks if fired upon first or if coming to the aid of a merchant ship. On August 1, 1801, the twelve gun schooner USS Enterprise under the command of Lieutenant Andrew Sterett encountered the fourteen gun Tripolitan polacca named Tripoli. USS Enterprise captured Tripoli after a long and bloody fight but because the squadron could not legally make a prize of the ship, it was stripped of its fighting capabilities and released.

As attacks on merchantmen continued, the United States government eventually authorized the United States Navy to send a second squadron to blockade Tripoli and attack their ships. In May 1802 Captain Daniel McNeill in USS Boston assisted two Swedish frigates in a battle while blockading Tripoli. In the action several Barbary vessels sortied and the Americans and Swedish frigates fought off the attack which then forced the Tripolitans back into harbor. In June 1803, USS John Adams and USS Enterprise defeated nine enemy gunboats and a polacre near Tripoli. The polacre was sunk and the gunboats forced to flee, the Americans suffered no casualties. The second squadron returned to the United States in 1803 and that same year another force was sent and operated until 1804. On October 31, 1803, USS Philadelphia grounded on a reef just off Tripoli Harbor. Under heavy fire from enemy shore batteries the Americans attempted to refloat their ship but she was hard aground. When Tripolitan gunboats approached for her capture, her commander surrendered his ship and was made a slave along with the crew. Philadelphia was then manned by the Tripolitans as a sort of harbor defence until February 16, 1804. On that night Lieutenant Stephen Decatur in the ketch  boarded and recaptured Philadelphia and scuttled her by fire. This was the most remembered action in the battle for Tripoli. Decatur became famous immediately after this and had a long career of serving the American navy with distinction. He later commanded American forces during the Second Barbary War in 1815.

At the final engagement of the war in April and May 1805, the brig , the schooner  and the sloop  provided gun support for ten American marines and soldiers leading a mercenary army against Derne. During the battle the Mediterranean Squadron vessels under Oliver Hazard Perry bombarded the city while the land forces besieged the Tripolitan garrison. When the city finally fell, the Dey of Algiers surrendered and the First Barbary War was over.

Second Barbary War

The Mediterranean Squadron continued to operate until 1807. That year the squadron was withdrawn which tempted the Barbary corsairs to attack American ships again. It was not until the end of the War of 1812 in 1815 that the United States Navy resumed operations against the Barbary coast. Only two battles were fought during the Second Barbary War. Decatur's squadron captured the Algerian flagship Mashouda of forty-six guns off Cape Gata on June 15 and later defeated the twenty-two gun Estedio off Cape Palos on June 19. After, the squadron arrived at Algiers and prepared for battle but before fighting began the enemy surrendered and the short war came to an end.

Ships of the Squadron

First Squadron
Commanded by Commodore Richard Dale.  Deployed in 1801, and returned to the United States in 1802.

Second Squadron
Commanded by Commodore Richard Valentine Morris, and later Commodore John Rodgers, who took command after Morris was relieved of duty by the president for inaction—he was later recommended for a court martial, but the president declined to pursue the matter.  Deployed in 1802, and returned to the United States in 1803.

Third Squadron
Commanded by Commodore Edward Preble.  Deployed in 1803, and returned to the United States in 1804.

In 1843, the squadron comprised four ships, Columbia, Cumberland, Fairfield and Plymouth.

Commanders

 Daniel Patterson 1832–1836
 Jesse D. Elliott 1836–1838
 Isaac Hull 1838–1841
Joseph Smith 1843
 William Bolton 1848
 Charles W. Morgan 1850
 Samuel Livingston Breese 1856–1859
 Uriah Phillips Levy 1860

References

Further reading
 London, Joshua E.Victory in Tripoli: How America's War with the Barbary Pirates Established the U.S. Navy and Shaped a Nation New Jersey: John Wiley & Sons, Inc., 2005.

 

Ship squadrons of the United States Navy
Barbary Wars
1801 establishments in the United States